Ben Balasador is a 1996 Philippine action film edited and directed by Pepe Marcos. The film stars Ian Veneracion in the title role.

Cast
 Ian Veneracion as Ben Balasador
 Beth Tamayo as Theresa
 Mark Gil as Nelson
 King Gutierrez as Marco
 Patrick Guzman as Geron
 Shirley Fuentes as Vanessa
 Charlie Davao as Bernard
 Bing Davao as Arturo
 Teresa Loyzaga as Ben's Sister
 Pocholo Montes as Mr. Dela Serna
 Tom Olivar as Maj. Rodriguez
 Jim Rosales as Jake
 Rhey Roldan as Nelson's Finale Goon
 Levi Ignacio as Nelson's Finale Goon
 Gio Santos as Card Dealer
 Rudy Lapid as Iking
 Gil Nartea as Informer
 Albert Eugenio as Informer
 Johnny Ramirez as Barangay Captain

References

External links

1996 films
1996 action films
Films directed by Pepe Marcos
Filipino-language films
Philippine action films
GMA Pictures films
OctoArts Films films